Joseph Nafaa (born March 14, 1969 in Andket, near Tripoli, Lebanon) is a clergyman of the Maronite Church and Curial Bishop of the Patriarchate of Antioch.

Life

Joseph Nafaa received on 14 September 1995 the sacrament of Holy Orders for the Archeparchy of Tripoli.

The Synod of the Maronite Church of Antioch chose him as Curial Bishop to the Patriarchate. Pope Francis confirmed his election on June 17, 2016 and named him Titular Bishop of Aradus.

His episcopal ordination was performed by the patriarch of Antioch, Bechara Boutros al-Rahi, on August 3, 2016 and his co-consecrators were Georges Bou-Jaoudé and Paul Nabil El-Sayah.

On 17 Jun 2017 Nafaa was appointed Auxiliary Bishop of Maronite Catholic Eparchy of Joubbé Lebanon.

References

External links
 http://www.catholic-hierarchy.org/bishop/bnafaa.html

21st-century Maronite Catholic bishops
21st-century Roman Catholic titular bishops
Living people
1969 births
Lebanese Maronites